Vermiliopsis is a genus of polychaetes belonging to the family Serpulidae.

The genus has cosmopolitan distribution.

Species:

Vermiliopsis annulata 
Vermiliopsis ctenophora 
Vermiliopsis cylindrica 
Vermiliopsis dubia 
Vermiliopsis fluctuata 
Vermiliopsis glacialis 
Vermiliopsis glandigera 
Vermiliopsis infundibulum 
Vermiliopsis labiata 
Vermiliopsis leptochaeta 
Vermiliopsis longiseta 
Vermiliopsis minuta 
Vermiliopsis monodiscus 
Vermiliopsis multiannulata 
Vermiliopsis negevensis 
Vermiliopsis notialis 
Vermiliopsis pluriannulata 
Vermiliopsis producta 
Vermiliopsis pygidialis 
Vermiliopsis spirorbis 
Vermiliopsis striaticeps 
Vermiliopsis zibrowii

References

Serpulidae
Annelid genera